Places with the Vietnamese syllable Xuyên in them include:
Bình Xuyên District, rural district (huyện) of Vĩnh Phúc province, Vietnam
Cẩm Xuyên District, rural district (huyện) of Hà Tĩnh province, Vietnam
Duy Xuyên District, district (huyện) of Quảng Nam province, Vietnam
Long Xuyên, capital city of An Giang province, Vietnam
Roman Catholic Diocese of Long Xuyên, Roman Catholic diocese of Vietnam
Mỹ Xuyên District, rural district (huyện) of Sóc Trăng province, Vietnam
Phú Xuyên District, district (huyện) of Hà Tây province, Vietnam
Quảng Xuyên, former district of South Vietnam
Vị Xuyên District is a district (huyện) of Hà Giang province, Vietnam
Xuyên Mộc, commune (xã) and village in Xuyên Mộc district, Bà Rịa–Vũng Tàu province, in Vietnam
Xuyên Mộc District, rural district (huyện) of Ba Ria–Vung Tau province, Vietnam

People with the syllable Xuyên in their names include:
Dominic Xuyen Van Nguyen, one of the Vietnamese Martyrs of Tonkin, saints canonized by Pope John Paul II
Lý Tế Xuyên (fl. 1400s), Vietnamese historian
Nguyễn Trọng Xuyên (1926–2012), Vietnam People's Army general
Nguyễn Thị Xuyến (fl. 2010s), Vietnamese footballer

See also
Ba Xuyen, breed of domestic pig from South Vietnam, specifically the Mekong Delta
Bình Xuyên, independent military force within the Vietnamese National Army
Xu Yan (disambiguation)
Xu Yuan (disambiguation)
Xue Yuan
Xu Wen